The United Methodist Episcopal Church in Park City, Montana, also known as Park City Methodist Episcopal Church and as First United Methodist Church, is a historic church built in 1898 that was listed on the National Register of Historic Places in 2010.

According to its NRHP nomination it is "a simple yet stately sandstone church building".  It was built by stonemason Manley Downs.

References 

Churches on the National Register of Historic Places in Montana
Churches completed in 1898
United Methodist churches in Montana
1898 establishments in Montana
National Register of Historic Places in Stillwater County, Montana